John "Jake" Custance Kerr,  (born September 21, 1944) is a Canadian business executive. He is the former chair and CEO of Lignum Ltd., one of Canada's largest privately held forest product companies.

Born in Vancouver, British Columbia, he received a bachelor's degree from the University of British Columbia in 1965 and a MBA from the University of California, Berkeley in 1967.

He has been a member of the board of directors of Scotiabank since 1999.

In 2002, he was made a Member of the Order of Canada "for his ability to bring together diverse interests" and having "served as Canada's lead negotiator in international trade talks". In 1997, he was awarded the Order of British Columbia.

References 

 

1944 births
Living people
Members of the Order of British Columbia
Members of the Order of Canada
Businesspeople from Vancouver
University of British Columbia alumni
Haas School of Business alumni
Directors of Scotiabank
Canadian corporate directors
Canadian chief executives